Ove Jensen (7 November 1919 – 22 April 2011) was a Danish amateur footballer, who played 12 games for the Denmark national football team and was an unused substitute as Denmark won bronze medals at the 1948 Summer Olympics. He was a quick and elegant goalkeeper, who modeled his game on legendary Danish international goalkeeper Svend Jensen. He played his club football with B.93, and made his international debut in 1945. He competed for the Danish goalkeeper spot with Egon Sørensen and Eigil Nielsen. In 1947, Jensen was selected for the Europe XI team, but was an unused substitute as the team lost 1-6 to the Great Britain national football team at Hampden Park.  Jensen played 12 international games until 1948, when he was eclipsed by Eigil Nielsen.

Honours
Denmark
 Olympic Bronze Medal: 1948

References

1919 births
2011 deaths
Association football goalkeepers
Danish men's footballers
Boldklubben af 1893 players
Olympic bronze medalists for Denmark
Footballers from Copenhagen